The information technology industry in India comprises information technology services and business process outsourcing. The share of the IT-BPM sector in the GDP of India is 7.4% in FY 2022. The IT and BPM industries' revenue is estimated at $227 billion in FY 2022. The domestic revenue of the IT industry is estimated at $49 billion, and export revenue is estimated at $181 billion in FY 2022. The IT–BPM sector overall employs 5 million people as of March 2022. In December 2022, Union Minister of State for Electronics and IT Rajeev Chandrasekhar, in a written reply to a question in Rajya Sabha informed that IT units registered with state-run Software Technology Parks of India (STPI) and Special Economic Zones have exported software worth Rs 11.59 lakh crore in 2021-22.

In recent years, many IT workers use forged experience certificates to gain entry into the Indian IT industry. These fake documents are provided by consultancies that are mainly operating out of Hyderabad and Bangalore. IT professionals frequently use proxy interviews to clear interviews, but the majority of the phoney candidates are rejected during the interview round. A 2017 study of technical support scams published at the NDSS Symposium found that, of the tech support scams in which the IPs involved could be geolocated, 85% could be traced to locations in India. Indian call centres are infamous for defrauding customers from the US and Europe. Kolkata, Bangalore, Hyderabad, and Mumbai are the main operating locations for these fraud call centres.

The Indian IT-BPM industry has the highest employee attrition rate. In recent years, the industry has seen a surge in resignations at all levels. As a global outsourcing hub, the Indian IT industry benefits from a lower cost of living and the consequent cheaper labor. As the IT–BPM sector evolves, many are concerned that artificial intelligence (AI) will drive significant automation and destroy jobs in the coming years. The United States accounts for two-thirds of India's IT services exports.

History

India's IT Services industry was born in Mumbai in 1967 with the establishment of Tata Consultancy Services who in 1977 partnered with Burroughs which began India's export of IT services. The first software export zone, SEEPZ – the precursor to the modern-day IT park – was established in Mumbai in 1973. More than 80 percent of the country's software exports were from SEEPZ in the 1980s.

Regulated VSAT links became visible in 1994. Desai (2006) describes the steps taken to relax regulations on linking in 1991:

A joint EU-India group of scholars was formed on 23 November 2001 to further promote joint research and development. On 25 June 2002, India and the European Union agreed to bilateral cooperation in the field of science and technology. From 2017, India holds an Associate Member State status at CERN, while a joint India-EU Software Education and Development Center will be located in Bangalore.

Indian IT revenues

In the contemporary world economy, India is the largest exporter of IT. The contribution of IT sector in India's GDP rose from 1.2% in 1998 to 10% in 2019. Exports dominate the Indian IT industry and constitute about 79% of the industry's total revenue. However, the domestic market is also significant, with robust revenue growth.

The industry's share of total Indian exports (merchandise plus services) increased from less than 4% in FY1998 to about 25% in FY2012. The technologically-inclined services sector in India accounts for 40% of the country's GDP and 30% of export earnings as of 2006, while employing only 25% of its workforce, according to Sharma (2006).  According to Gartner, the "Top Five Indian IT Services Providers" are Tata Consultancy Services, Infosys, Wipro, Tech Mahindra, and HCL Technologies.

The IT and BPM industry's revenue is estimated at US$194 billion in FY 2021, an increase of 2.3% YoY. The domestic revenue of the IT industry is estimated at US$45 billion and export revenue is estimated at US$150 billion in FY 2021. The IT industry employed almost 2.8 million employees in FY 2021. The IT–BPM sector overall employs 4.5 million people as of March 2021.

In 2022, companies within the sector faced significant employee attrition and intense competition in hirings. Indian IT revenues grow fastest in a decade to $227 billion in COVID-19 pandemic -hit FY22. The IT–BPM sector overall employs 5 million people as of March 2022.  NASSCOM in its Strategic Review predicted that the IT industry can achieve the ambitious target of being a US$ 350 billion by FY26 growing at a rate of 11-14 per cent.

Largest Indian IT companies based on market capitalisation
Top IT services companies in India in 2022 by market capitalization. In September 2021, TCS recorded a market capitalisation of US$ 200 billion, making it the first Indian IT tech company to do so. On 24 August 2021, Infosys became the fourth Indian company to reach $100 billion in market capitalization.

Largest Indian IT companies in India based on revenue
Top IT services companies in India in 2022 by revenue.

State wise revenue in IT exports

Below is the State wise list of revenue in IT exports as of FY2022.

Major information technology hubs

Bangalore
 
Bangalore is a global technology hub and is India's biggest tech hub. As of fiscal 2016–17, Bangalore accounted for 38% of total IT exports from India worth $45 billion, employing 10 lakh people directly and 30 lakh indirectly. The city is known as the "Silicon Valley of India". Notable tech parks are Electronic City, ITPL, Bagmane Tech Park, Embassy Golf Links, Manyata Tech Park, Global Village Tech Park, Embassy TechVillage. Apart from these IT companies are also located in several other parts of the city. Notable IT companies of the area include Infosys, Wipro, HCL Technologies, SAP Labs, Accenture, TCS, Oracle, IBM India, Sonata Software, Mindtree, and Intuit India.

Bangalore is also known as the "startup capital of India"; the city is home to 44 percent of all Indian unicorn startup companies as of 2020.

Hyderabad 

Hyderabad –  known for the HITEC City or Cyberabad – is India's second largest information technology exporter and a major global IT hub, and the largest bioinformatics hub in India. Hyderabad has emerged as the second largest city in the country for software exports pipping competitors Chennai and Pune. Notable tech companies include Microsoft , Amazon, Google, Apple, Salesforce, Capgemini, Accenture, AMD, Deloitte, Intel, Tata Consultancy Services, HCL Technologies, Oracle Corporation,  Qualcomm, Dell, Cognizant, Novartis, Pega, J.P Morgan, UBS.  As of 2022, the IT exports from Hyderabad was ₹183,569 crore (US$23 billion), the city houses 1500 IT and ITES companies that provide 7,78,121 employment. Notable tech and pharma parks are Nanakramguda Financial District, HITEC City, Genome Valley, and Hyderabad Pharma City.  The number of startups in Telangana had increased from 400 in 2016 to 2,000 in 2022.  Hyderabad added two companies in unicorn startup list in first two months of 2022. Microsoft, Amazon, Google has their largest campus outside US in Hyderabad. Hyderabad is also home to Asia's largest US Consulate General Campus owned by US Embassy at Financial District.

Chennai

 
, Chennai is India's third-largest exporter of information technology (IT) after Bangalore and Hyderabad  and business process outsourcing (BPO) services. TIDEL Park in Chennai was billed as Asia's largest IT park when it was built. Notable tech parks are International Tech Park, DLF Cybercity SEZ, Mahindra World City, SIPCOT IT Park, Olympia Tech Park, One Indiabulls Park, L&T Estancia IT SEZ, Ramanujan IT City and Chennai one SEZ. City has an expressway called as IT expressways and a preferred location for IT industries. Major software companies such as Tata Consultancy Services, Infosys, Zoho, Capgemini, Amazon, Mindtree, Cognizant, Accenture, UST Global, Sify, BirlaSoft, HCL Technologies and Comcast have their offices set up here, with some of them making Chennai their largest base.

Pune
The Rajiv Gandhi Infotech Park in Hinjawadi is a ₹60,000 crore (US$8.9 billion) project by the Maharashtra Industrial Development Corporation (MIDC). Besides Hinjawadi, IT companies are also located at Magarpatta, Kharadi, Kalyani Nagar, 
Yerawada, Aundh and several other parts of the city. Major IT companies like TCS, Wipro, Infosys, Cognizant, IBM, Accenture, Tech Mahindra, Cybage, Zensar Technologies, Amdocs, Capgemini, Quick heal, Amazon, FIS (Company), HCL Technologies, Barclays, Credit Suisse, UBS, Netcracker Technology, Persistent Systems,KPIT. Harbinger Knowledge Products have offices in Pune. As of 2019, the IT sector employs more than 500,000 people.

Kolkata

Kolkata is one of the major and the biggest IT hub of East India. As of 2020, The IT sector employs more than 200,000 people directly. Total export from IT sector was estimated at ₹22,897 crore in 2018-19. 
Major software companies such as Tata Consultancy Services, Capgemini, Wipro, Ericsson, Mindtree, Cognizant, Accenture, ITC Infotech, RS Software, IBM  have their offices set up at Salt Lake and Newtown, which falls under Kolkata Metropolitan Region.

Delhi NCR
Delhi NCR is one of the major IT hub in India. Cities in NCR  like Gurgaon and Noida have several companies that serves the local and global markets who take help from these IT hubs. Major software companies like Microsoft, Oracle Corporation and Adobe Systems have their presence in Noida and Gurgaon.
In addition to the above mentioned major IT companies, Delhi NCR has witnessed tremendous growth of emerging IT startups as well as branches of international IT companies in service as well as product domain. Appy Pie AppsBuilder, Affle, Appinventiv, KiwiTech and Appsums are some of such emerging Information Technology companies in the region.

See also
 List of Indian IT companies
 List of special economic zones in India
 Software Technology Parks of India
 List of publicly listed software companies of India
 Supercomputing in India
Data centre industry in India

References

Sources
 
  
 
  
  
 
 
 Arora, Payal. "Politics of Algorithms, Indian Citizenship, and the Colonial Legacy." Global Digital Cultures: Perspectives from South Asia, edited by ASWIN PUNATHAMBEKAR and SRIRAM MOHAN, University of Michigan Press, 2019, pp. 37–52, . 
 Gupta, S. D., Raychaudhuri, A. and Haldar, S. K. (2015) 'Determinants of Exports of Information Technology in India: An Empirical Analysis', South Asia Economic Journal, 16(1), pp. 64–81.  
 Dedrick, Jason, and Kenneth L. Kraemer. "Information Technology in India: The Quest for Self-Reliance." Asian Survey, vol. 33, no. 5, University of California Press, 1993, pp. 463–92, . 
 Ramesh Subramanian (2006) India and Information Technology: A Historical & Critical Perspective, Journal of Global Information Technology Management, 9:4, 28-46,   
 M.D., Pradeep and B.K., Ravindra, Effective Disbursement of Social Security Benefits to the Labour through Information Technology in India (April 15, 2017). International Journal of Advanced Trends in Engineering and Technology (IJATET), Volume I, Issue I, 2016,   
 Thomas P.N. (1994) The State and Information Technology in India: Emerging Trends. In: Nagel S.S. (eds) Asian Development and Public Policy. Policy Studies Organization Series. Palgrave Macmillan, London.   

 

Krishnan, Rishikesha T., and Ganesh N. Prabhu. "Innovation in the Indian Information Technology Industry: A Study of the Software Product Development Process." Science, Technology and Society 7, no. 1 (March 2002): 91–115. 

 
Industries in India